The Geneve 9640 is an enhanced TI-99/4A clone. It was sold by the company Myarc as a card to fit into the Texas Instruments TI Peripheral Expansion System. Released in 1987, it is in many ways similar to the earlier TI-99/8, which was in prototype form in early 1983. The Geneve 9640 was designed by Paul Charlton, and the graphical swan on the boot up screen was designed by Mi-Kyung Kim.

Hardware 
The Geneve 9640 features a 16-bit TMS9995 processor clocked at 12 MHz. A Yamaha V9938 video display processor (the same one used in the MSX2 family of home computers) provides 256 color graphics at a 256 x 424 resolution, 16 color graphics at a 512 x 424 resolution, and an 80 column text mode. Audio is produced via an SN76496 programmable sound generator, capable of producing three simultaneous square waves at sixteen different volume levels, as well as an additional noise channel that could produce either periodic or white noise in three different frequencies and at sixteen different volumes. Onboard memory consists of 512 KB CPU RAM, which can be upgraded to at least 2 MB through the use of the Myarc Memex Expansion Card or similar, as well as 128 KB video RAM. The board also includes a battery backed real time clock (RTC). An IBM PC XT compatible detached keyboard and a mouse are used for input. The Geneve 9640 is compatible with nearly all software written for the TI-99/4A. An adapter was made by a company named Rave to allow the sidecar-only Speech Synthesizer to be installed inside the Peripheral Expansion System.

Software 
The following software is bundled with the Geneve.
Cartridge Saver, allowing most cartridges to be saved to and run from disk
GPL, a program used to set up a 99/4a environment to run software saved by Cartridge Saver or most other 99/4a-specific software
Advanced BASIC, supporting 80 columns and compatible with TI BASIC and TI Extended BASIC
Pascal Runtime (not officially released by Myarc)
TI-Writer Word Processor, upgraded to 80 columns and increased speed
Microsoft Multiplan, upgrade to 80 columns, increased memory, and increased speed
MDOS, the Myarc Disk Operating System
In 1993, Beery Miller, the publisher of 9640 News, organized a group of Geneve 9640 owners and was able to purchase all rights to the source code for MDOS, Advanced Basic, the PSYSTEM runtime module, and the GPL Interpreter from Myarc and Paul Charlton.

Over the years, MDOS has been updated by individuals including Tim Tesch, Clint Pulley, Alan Beard, John Johnson, James Schroeder, Mike Maksimik, James Uzzell, Tony Knerr, Beery Miller, and others. Support adding SCSI, IDE, and larger ramdisks were added in the earlier years from the buyout. In late 2020 and early 2021 with the release of the TIPI for the TI-99/4A, the Geneve was interfaced with the TIPI and a Raspberry PI providing TCP socket access and nearly unlimited high speed hard-drive like file access.

A small but active base of users still exist on www.Atariage.com as of 2021 where Tim Tesch, Beery Miller, and others provide support.

References

External links
Myarc Geneve 9640 Family Computer
Myarc Geneve 9640 Software
Geneve 9640 - a close look at the system board and sales flyer
Geneve 9640 at the Home Computer Museum
Photo of Geneve 9640 booting - HD-based vertical PEB system belonging to Gregory McGill
Photo of Geneve showing swan image - from Mainbyte
1988 Dallas TI Fair - mixed Geneve 9640 and TI-99/4A photos
OLD-COMPUTERS.COM - Geneve 9640 page at old-computers.com

TI-99/4A
Home computers